Kentjur is a common name for several flowering plants in the family Zingiberaceae native to Asia with rhizomes used as spices. Kentjur may refer to:

Curcuma zedoaria
Kaempferia galanga